Phyllopetalia pudu is a species of dragonfly in the family Austropetaliidae. It is found in Argentina and Chile. Its natural habitat is rivers. It is threatened by habitat loss.

References

Austropetaliidae
Taxonomy articles created by Polbot